Carl Niehaus (born 25 December 1959) is the former spokesman for South African ruling party the African National Congress, former spokesman for Nelson Mandela, and was a political prisoner after being convicted of treason against South Africa's former government. He stepped down as ANC spokesman in February 2009 after admitting to maladministration of his own finances, extensive borrowing from political contacts and fraud, notably feigning the death of his mother, Magrietha Niehaus‚ in order to get out of 4.3 million rand debt owed to a landlord. He is a vocal supporter of former President Jacob Zuma.  On 12th December 2022 Niehaus was expelled from the ANC.

Treason conviction and sentence
As a young theology student, Niehaus was reported to the security police by his flatmate, warrant officer Robert Whitecross, after confiding in him about blowing up the gasworks in Johannesburg. Niehaus had incriminated himself (and his wife-to-be Jansie Lourens) by unknowingly using a police-issued camera to photograph the intended target whilst (again unknowingly) travelling in a police vehicle and then confiding his act to this police informant.  In 1983 he was convicted of treason and received a prison sentence of 15 years.  He was incarcerated on 25 November 1983 and released on 20 March 1991.

Education
In February 2008 investigations by a number of media organisations found that Niehaus had falsely claimed to hold a master's degree and a doctorate in theology (summa cum laude) from Utrecht University. Claimed qualifications confirmed to be true included a Bachelor's in Theology from the University of South Africa (Unisa) awarded in April 1988 and an honours degree (Cum Laude) from the same institution two years later.

Career
In 1994 he became the spokesman for Nelson Mandela and, subsequently, a member of parliament and the chairman of the correctional services committee. In late 1996 he was appointed South Africa's ambassador to the Netherlands. At the end of his term as ambassador, he became an executive director of Nicro, the National Institute for Crime Prevention and the Reintegration of Offenders. In late 2000 he became the joint chairman of the Home for all initiative, a campaign by white activists to apologise for apartheid. In 2020 Niehaus was subpoenaed to testify at the re-opened inquest into the death in detention of Neil Aggett after submitting an affidavit to the effect that he (Niehaus) was badly tortured at the hands of the security police when in detention. In January 2021 he was given notice of suspension from his position in the ANC for among other things, disregarding an ANC NWC directive for the MKMVA to disband, publicly criticising the ANC leadership, bringing the ANC into disrepute.

2009 scandal
In February 2009 Niehaus stepped down as spokesman for the ANC after a newspaper reported on a "broad trail of bad debt and broken promises" stemming from his personal financial mismanagement, including one instance of fraud, and claiming that his mother had died. Niehaus tearfully confessed to most of the allegations against him in the same article.

Parts of his confession were questioned on the same day, when the Gauteng provincial government said it had independently discovered that Niehaus had forged the signatures of provincial ministers to secure a loan. Niehaus claimed he had confessed the forgery within hours of committing it. Niehaus stepped down as spokesman of the ANC the same day in what the party described as a mutual decision. His debts were later estimated to total nearly R4.5 million. It was reported in 2017 that Niehaus was still in debt and concocting what appeared to be a fraudulent scheme to get out of trouble.

2017 ANC presidential campaign 
In 2017 Niehaus reemerged as a spokesperson for the UMkhonto we Sizwe Military Veterans' Association and a key member of the campaign team for Nkosazana Dlamini-Zuma's failed bid for the ANC presidency. In mid 2018, the MKMVA apparently apologised to the ANC for statements made by Niehaus regarding the land question.

Personal life
In 1986 Niehaus married Jansie Lourens, who had recruited him into the armed struggle against apartheid and who was sentenced to four years for the same treason plot that saw Niehaus jailed. The couple divorced in 2002 and Niehaus married Linda Thango.

In September 2008 he married businesswoman Mafani Gunguluza, and in 2012 he told 702 Radio that they had separated. In 2019 he was reported as having a new girlfriend.

References

Citations

Sources

Further reading

External links
 Website Universiteit van Utrecht, accessdate 2009-03-16

1959 births
Living people
African National Congress politicians
Ambassadors of South Africa to the Netherlands
Members of the National Assembly of South Africa
People convicted of treason
Place of birth missing (living people)
Prisoners and detainees of South Africa
South African prisoners and detainees
White South African anti-apartheid activists